Erdal Pekdemir (born 13 June 1992) is a Turkish footballer who plays for Karaköprü Belediyespor. He made his Süper Lig debut on 18 May 2013.

References

External links
 
 
 
 

1992 births
Living people
People from Piraziz
Turkish footballers
Orduspor footballers
Süper Lig players
Association football midfielders